In universal algebra, a congruence-permutable algebra is an algebra whose congruences commute under composition. This symmetry has several equivalent characterizations, which lend to the analysis of such algebras. Many familiar varieties of algebras, such as the variety of groups, consist of congruence-permutable algebras, but some, like the variety of lattices, have members that are not congruence-permutable.

Definition 
Given an algebra , a pair of congruences  are said to permute when . An algebra  is called congruence-permutable when each pair of congruences of  permute.

Properties 
In 1954 Maltsev gave two other conditions that are equivalent to the one given above defining a congruence-permutable variety of algebras. This initiated the study of congruence-permutable varieties.

Theorem (Maltsev, 1954) 
Suppose that  is a variety of algebras. The following are equivalent:

Such a term is called a Maltsev term and congruence-permutable varieties are also known as Maltsev varieties in his honor.

Examples 
Most classical varieties in abstract algebra, such as groups, rings, and Lie algebras are congruence-permutable.

Nonexamples 
Viewed as a lattice the chain with three elements is not congruence-permutable and hence neither is the variety of lattices.

References 

Universal algebra